Incholi may refer to:

 Incholi, a village in Meerut District, India
 Inchauli, a village in Muzaffarnagar District, India

See also
 Ancholi, a neighbourhood of Karachi in Pakistan